Risto Ristović (Serbian Cyrillic: Ристо Ристовић; born 5 May 1988) is a Serbian footballer, playing for FK Dinamo Pančevo.

Career
Risto Ristović, born in Valjevo, began his career in his native Serbia playing for Mačva He moved to OFK Beograd for the 2006/07 season. In the 2007/08 season he was on loan to FK Vujić Voda. In 2008, Ristović moved to FK Banat Zrenjanin and played four seasons for them in the Serbian First League. In 2012, he moved to FK Novi Pazar playing in the Serbian Superliga. He made his debut in the Serbian SuperLiga playing against FK Radnički Niš.

In May 2015, Ristović solved his contract with AE Larissa FC in the Greek Football League.

In January 2017, Ristović went on trial with Tajik champions Istiklol.

On 21 June 2017 Ristović signed a one-year contract with Montenegrin champions FK Budućnost.

Career statistics

References

1988 births
Living people
Serbian footballers
Serbian expatriate footballers
Serbian First League players
Serbian SuperLiga players
Azerbaijan Premier League players
Kazakhstan Premier League players
FK Mačva Šabac players
FK Novi Pazar players
FK Banat Zrenjanin players
FK Voždovac players
FK Zemun players
FC Baku players
FC Okzhetpes players
FK Radnik Surdulica players
FK Kolubara players
FK Dinamo Pančevo players
Sportspeople from Valjevo
Association football midfielders
Expatriate footballers in Azerbaijan
Expatriate footballers in Greece
Expatriate footballers in Kazakhstan
Expatriate footballers in Montenegro
Serbian expatriate sportspeople in Azerbaijan
Serbian expatriate sportspeople in Greece
Serbian expatriate sportspeople in Kazakhstan
Serbian expatriate sportspeople in Montenegro